Clivina ngayensis is a species of ground beetle in the subfamily Scaritinae. It was described by Burgeon in 1935.

References

ngayensis
Beetles described in 1935